The second season of the American television drama series Mistresses premiered on June 2, 2014, on ABC. The series is based on the U.K. series of the same name and was adapted by K.J. Steinberg, it stars Alyssa Milano before she left the series, Jes Macallan, Rochelle Aytes and Yunjin Kim as the four lead characters.

Cast

Main cast
 Alyssa Milano as Savannah "Savi" Davis
 Yunjin Kim as Dr. Karen Kim
 Rochelle Aytes as April Malloy
 Jes Macallan as Josslyn "Joss" Carver
 Brett Tucker as Harry Davis
 Jason George as Dominic Taylor

Recurring cast
 Justin Hartley as Scott Trosman
 Catherine Kim as Anna Choi
 Ricky Whittle as Daniel Zamora
 Corinne Massiah as Lucy Malloy
 Rebeka Montoya as Antonia 'Toni' Ruiz
 Jason Gerhardt as Zack Kilmer
 Matthew Del Negro as Jacob Pollack
 Jason Gray-Stanford as FBI Agent Adam Thomas
 Brian Hallisay as Ben Odell
 Helena Mattsson as Greta Jager

Guest stars
 Joseph May as Mickey
 Ashley Newbrough as Kyra
 Krista Allen as Janine Winterbaum
 Elaine Hendrix as Samantha
 Dondre Whitfield as Paul Malloy
 Soleil Moon Frye as Herself
 Penelope Ann Miller as Elizabeth Grey
 Tabrett Bethell as Kate Davis
 John Heard as Bruce Davis

Production
On September 25, 2013, ABC renewed Mistresses for a second season. Jason Gerhardt appeared this season as Zack, a lost soul that has a unique connection with Savi. Rebeka Montoya and Catherine Kim recurred this season, with Montoya in the role of Toni, a lawyer who is set to stir things up, while Kim appeared as Anna Choi, Karen's new patient. Joseph May joined the series in the recurring role of Mickey, the gay friend and business associate of April. Also, Krista Allen guest starred as Janine Winterbaum, a housewife from Beverly Hills who hires Harry and Joss to cater an event. Soleil Moon Frye guest stars as herself, in an episode where Joss attempts to acquire her as a celebrity client in her new party planning business. Justin Hartley signed onto the role of Scott, a new love interest of Joss. Helena Mattsson recurred as Greta Jager, a European supermodel who hires Joss as her restaurant's event planner. John Heard guest starred as Bruce Davis, the estranged father of Savi.

Episodes

Ratings

References

External links
 
 
  Episodes available at

02
2014 American television seasons